Felicita Maria di Boemondo of Antioch (d. after 1172) was a Princess of Antioch and the Dogaressa of Venice by marriage to the Doge Vital II Michele (r. 1156–1172).

She was the daughter of Bohemund of Antioch. As a dogaressa, Felicita Maria was known as a benefactor of especially the convent San Zaccaria. Visiting San Zaccaria at the time of the murder of her spouse, she chose never to leave the convent again.

References 
 Staley, Edgcumbe: The dogaressas of Venice : The wives of the doges, London : T. W. Laurie, 1910

Dogaressas of Venice
12th-century Venetian people 
12th-century Venetian women